is a female Japanese judoka.

She started judo at the age of 9.

Her favorite techniques are Osoto Gari and Sankaku Jime.

In 2011, she won the gold medal in the −78 kg weight class at the World Judo Championships Juniors in Cape Town.

In 2015, she won the gold medal in the Half-heavyweight (78 kg) division at the 2015 World Judo Championships  at the age of 20.

In 2021, she won the gold medal in her event at the 2021 Judo Grand Slam Tashkent held in Tashkent, Uzbekistan.

She won the silver medal in her event at the 2022 Judo Grand Slam Paris held in Paris, France.

References

External links
 
 
 
 

1994 births
Living people
Japanese female judoka
Asian Games medalists in judo
Judoka at the 2014 Asian Games
Asian Games gold medalists for Japan
Asian Games bronze medalists for Japan
Judoka at the 2016 Summer Olympics
Olympic judoka of Japan
Universiade medalists in judo
People from Ōita (city)
Sportspeople from Ōita Prefecture
Medalists at the 2014 Asian Games
Universiade bronze medalists for Japan
Medalists at the 2013 Summer Universiade
20th-century Japanese women
21st-century Japanese women